Per Mathisen (born 7 October 1969) is a Norwegian jazz bassist and composer who has worked with Terri Lyne Carrington, Geri Allen, Gary Thomas, Bill Bruford, Alex Acuña, Gary Husband, Ralph Peterson, Nguyen Le and Terje Rypdal. He is married to pianist Olga Konkova and is the brother of Hans Mathisen, Nils Mathisen, and Ole Mathisen.

Career
Mathisen was educated on the Jazz program at Trondheim musikkonservatorium 1991–93, followed by a period at the Berklee School of Music in US, and returned to Norway in 1994.

He played in various bands in the Oslo region, e.g. "Erlend Gjerde Quintet", "Inge Stangvik Quartet" and "Storeslem", and the records Her point of view (1997), Northern crossings (2000) and Some things from home (2001), as well as Unbound (2002/2006), with Olga Konkova.

In 2001 he toured in Europe with Terri Lyne Carrington, has also played with a number of international names, such as Geri Allen, Gary Thomas, Bill Bruford, Gary Husband, Ralph Peterson, Nguyen Le and Terje Rypdal. From 2003 he was member of the transatlantic jazz collective NYNDK (with a release in 2006), so-called because the musicians come from New York, Norway and Denmark.

Mathisen has otherwise participated on recordings with the band "String Zone" (Mystery bag, 2003), Hans Mathisen (Quiet songs 2002–04), Helge Sunde & Norske Store Orkester (Denada, 2005) and Roy Powell Peak Experience Trio (2006), and has been a regular feature as bassist and leader of "workshops" in Groove Valley (annually held in Beiarn in Nordland) where artistic director is Jan Gunnar Hoff. 2013 Played with Joseph Williams, Bill Champlin and Peter Friestedt All Star Band.

Discography

As leader
 2015: Ospitalita Generosa (Alessa) with Ruggero Robin and Gergő Borlai
 2016: Sounds Of 3 (Losen) with Frode Alnæs and Giraldo Piloto
 2016: New York City Magic (Alessa) with Utsi Zimring and David Kikoski
 2018: Barxeta II (Losen) with Jan Gunnar Hoff and Horacio "El Negro" Hernandez
 2019: Sounds of 3 Edition 2 (Losen)

As sideman
With Olga Konkova
1997: Her point of view (Candid)
2000: Northern Crossings (Candid)
2001: Some Things from Home (Candid)
2006: Unbound (Alessa)
2011: My Voice (Losen)
2015: The Goldilocks Zone (Losen)

With String Zone
2003: Mystery Bag (Nagel Heyer)
2011: Cookin' At Hvaler (Alessa)

With Gerald Preinfalk
2003: Tan Go Go (Quinton)
2006: Giuffre Zone (PAO)
2014: Art of Duo (Col legno)

With Hans Mathisen
2004: Quiet Songs (Curling Legs)
2011: Timeless Tales (Curling Legs)
2014: The Island (Curling Legs)

With NYNDK (New York, Norway, Denmark)
2004: NYNDK (Jazzheads)
2005: Nordic Disruption (Jazzheads)
2006: The Hunting of the Snark (Jazzheads)

With Alex Acuña
2009: Jungle City (Alessa)
2012: Barxeta (Losen)

With Haakon Graf Trio
2010: License to Chill (Nordic)
2016: Sunrain (Losen)

With Ole Mathisen and Paolo Vinaccia
2011: Elastics (Losen)

With Frode Alnæs
2016: Kanestrøm (Øra Fonogram)

With others
1996: Ut På Vegom (Grappa Music), with Huldregåva
1996: Pausposten Extra! (Norsk), with Ole Paus
1998: Damebesøk (Norsk), with Jonas Fjeld and Ole Paus
1998: X (Nordicae), with Veslemøy Solberg
2001: Tidevann (BMG), with Jonas Fjeld
2003: Boska (DAT), with Johan Sara Jr. & Group
2004: Løvehjerte (Nordicae), with Veslemøy Solberg
2004: La Det Sne, La Det Sne, La Det Sne! (Jazzavdelingen), with Nora Brockstedt in duet with Kåre Conradi
2005: Denada (ACT), with Helge Sunde & Norske Store Orkester, featuring Olga Konkova and Marilyn Mazur
2005: Christmas Songs (Jazzavdelingen), with Nora Brockstedt
2006: Peak Experience Trio (Totemic), with Roy Powell and Ivan Makedonov
2008: Edvard Grieg in Jazz Mood (Universal), with Kjell Karlsen Big Band
2006: Må'Ån Skin (Mud Music), with Dagfinn Hansen
2006: Peak Experience Trio (Totemic), with Roy Powell
2006: Denada (ACT), with Helge Sunde, Norske Store Orkester featuring Olga Konkova and Marilyn Mazur
2007: Both Sides (Lydmuren), with Vigdis Wisur
2008: Gullmåne (Nordicae), with Veslemøy Solberg
2008: Alene (Mud Music), with Dagfinn Hansen
2008: Edvard Grieg in Jazz Mood (Universal), with Kjell Karlsen Big Band
2012: Mirage (2012), with 'FFEAR'
2012: De Beste – 60 År I Livet – 40 År På Veien (Sony BMG)
2013: Windfall – Music by Helge Sunde (Ozella Music), with Ensemble Denada
2014: Live In Coimbra (2014), with Zanussi Five
2015: Røter (Nordicae), with Veslemøy Solberg and Jon Solberg
2015: Ut Av Mitt Hjerte (Grappa Music), with Guri Schanke

References

External links

Per Bass Mathisen Official website
Per Mathisen – Groove Valley
ACUNA/HOFF/MATHISEN, "JUNGLE CITY", LIVE FROM ZAGREB, CROATIA 2009. on YouTube
Dance With a Stranger 2014 Per Mathisen Bass Solo, Frode Alnæs. on YouTube

20th-century Norwegian upright-bassists
21st-century Norwegian upright-bassists
20th-century Norwegian bass guitarists
Norwegian male bass guitarists
21st-century Norwegian bass guitarists
Norwegian jazz upright-bassists
Norwegian musicians
Scandinavian musicians
Male double-bassists
Jazz double-bassists
Norwegian jazz composers
Male jazz composers
Alessa Records artists
Candid Records artists
Losen Records artists
Norwegian University of Science and Technology alumni
Musicians from Sandefjord
1969 births
Living people
21st-century Norwegian guitarists
20th-century Norwegian male musicians
21st-century Norwegian male musicians
Ensemble Denada members
Dance with a Stranger (band) members